This is a list of films which have placed number one at the weekend box office in Japan during 2009.

Highest-grossing films

References

 Note: Click on the relevant weekend to view specifics.

2009
Japan
2009 in Japanese cinema